Bea Knecht (born 1967, Brugg, Switzerland) is a Swiss computer scientist, entrepreneur and founder of Zattoo.

Life 

Knecht grew up in Windisch and studied computer science at the University of California at Berkeley. She completed a master's degree in Business Administrations at the International Institute for Management Development (IMD) in Lausanne. After graduation, she worked in consulting and management, from 1996 to 2001 as an associate partner at McKinsey. As a software developer, Knecht was instrumental in the development of UBS OpenLAN, SAP xRPM and Levanta.

In 2005, Knecht co-founded Zattoo, a Swiss TV streaming service based in Zurich, with Sugih Jamin. In 2012, she stepped down as CEO and is now Vice Chairman of the Board of Directors. Knecht is also the founder and Chairman of the Board of Directors of the startups Genistat, a data science company, and Levuro, an interactive advertising company. As a developer and entrepreneur, she has received various awards and accolades.

Knecht has been a member of the Federal Media Commission (EMEK) since 2014.

Until 2012, Knecht lived as a man. Since her transition, she has publicly expressed her views on gender issues.

Awards 

 2014: Best of Swiss Web, Honorary Award
 2014: Digital Lifetime Award from IAB Switzerland Association
 2020: Emmy Award in Technology and Engineering

References

External links 

 Website of Zattoo
 Website of Genistat
 Website of Levuro

Swiss businesspeople
Computer scientists
Swiss transgender people
University of California alumni
1967 births
Living people